William Giles Hills (June 26, 1841 – April 18, 1912) was a soldier in the United States Army during the American Civil War. He received the Medal of Honor.

Biography
Hill was born on 26 Jun 1841 in Conewango, New York.

Hills was a Private with Company E, 9th New York Cavalry. He earned the Medal of Honor during the Civil War for heroism on September 26, 1864, at North Fork, Virginia.

Hill died on 18 Apr 1912, and was buried in East Newark Cemetery, Newark, New York.

Medal of Honor citation
Rank and organization: Private, Company E, 9th New York Volunteer Cavalry Regiment. Place and date: At North Fork, Va., September 26, 1864

Citation:

Voluntarily carried a severely wounded comrade out of a heavy fire of the enemy.

See also
 List of Medal of Honor recipients
 List of American Civil War Medal of Honor recipients: G–L

Notes

References

External links
 

1841 births
1912 deaths
United States Army Medal of Honor recipients
People of New York (state) in the American Civil War
American Civil War recipients of the Medal of Honor